Cyperus matagoroensis is a species of sedge that is native to south eastern parts of Africa.

See also 
 List of Cyperus species

References 

matagoroensis
Plants described in 2004
Flora of Tanzania
Flora of Zambia